Danusorn Puisangjan is a professional footballer from Thailand who plays for PTT Rayong in the Thai Division 1 League.

External links
Profile at Thaipremierleague.co.th

Living people
Danusorn Puisangjan
1984 births
Association football midfielders
Danusorn Puisangjan